Following are the results of the 1956 Soviet First League football championship. FC Spartak Minsk and FC Krylya Sovetov Kuibyshev winning the championship.

Final standings

Zone I

Number of teams by republics

Zone II

Number of teams by republics

See also
 1956 Soviet Class A
 1956 Soviet Cup

References

 1956 at rsssf.com

1956
2
Soviet
Soviet